Dakuan Da Munda (English: The Bandits’ Son) is a 2018 Indian Punjabi biographical movie  the novel of same title. The film plots life of former Kabaddi player Mintu Gurusaria from Gurusar Jodha village, Muktsar. The movie is directed by Mandeep Benipal, Associate Director Vinod Kumar features Dev Kharoud, Jagjeet Sandhu, Sukhdeep Sukh and Pooja Verma in lead characters along with Lucky Dhaliwal and Hardeep Gill. The film was released on 10 August 2018.

Cast
Dev Kharoud as Mintu Gurusaria alias Brinjendra Singh Sandhu
Pooja Verma as Rajji
Jagjeet Sandhu as Romi Gill
Lucky Dhaliwal as Junglee
Hardeep Gill as Mintu Gurusaria Father
Sukhdeep Sukh as Bhau
Anita Meet as  Mintu Gurusaria Mother
Kuljinder Sidhu
Vinod kumar

Release
Dakuan Da Munda was released on 10 August 2018.

Soundtrack
The music soundtrack of Dakuaan Da Munda was composed by Byg Byrd, Laddi Gill, Veer Baljit and Young Blood. They consists of six tracks.

Reception

Box office
Dakuan Da Munda opened as second highest Punjabi film of 2018 after Carry On Jatta 2 & sixth highest of all time. Film raked ₹2.06 Crores on its opening day from India. Film had grossed ₹64.6 lacs at Australian Box Office and ₹22.6 lacs in New Zealand. In Canada Dakuaan Da Munda had grossed ₹1.63 Crores and ₹38.2 lacs in USA.

Critical reception
Amit Arora of The Times of India gave the film a rating of 3 out of 5, noting, "...the movie is perhaps a tad more honest than most such movies are known to be, though just as high on romanticizing and eulogizing the main character... The film is not a social commentary on the drug menace of Punjab but more like one person's story, by which he hopes to inspire others to kick the habit." Arora praised the movie for sticking to the story's "tight curves" as well as the performances of the lead actors. However he criticized some fight scenes and the music in the film. Arora also noted, "Given that it is apparently the first Punjabi film based on an autobiography, it is not a bad start for the regional film industry."

Sequel
A sequel named Dakuaan Da Munda 2 was released in cinemas on 27 May 2022.

References

External links 
 

2018 films
Indian biographical films
Punjabi-language Indian films
2010s biographical films
Films scored by Laddi Gill